Mombu is a loa who stutters and causes heavy rains in Voodoo.

References

Voodoo gods
Rain deities